Series 37 of University Challenge began on 9 July 2007 and was broadcast on BBC Two. This is a list of the matches played, their scores, and outcomes.

Main draw

 Winning teams are highlighted in bold.
 Teams with green scores (winners) returned in the next round, while those with red scores (losers) were eliminated.
 Teams with orange scores have lost, but survived as highest scoring losers.
 Teams with black scores have been disqualified.

First round

Highest Scoring Losers Playoffs

Second round

Quarterfinals

Semifinals

Final

 The trophy and title were awarded to the Christ Church team comprising Alex Bubb, Charles Markland, Max Kaufman and Susannah Darby.
 The trophy was presented by Joan Bakewell.
 In March 2009, it was revealed that Charles Markland, a member of the winning team from Christ Church, Oxford, had transferred his studies to Balliol College halfway through the series. He claimed that his team captain had contacted a researcher concerning the situation, and had been told that this was not a problem and that the same team should be maintained for continuity purposes.

Notes

External links
Blanchflower Results Table from blanchflower.org

2008
2007 British television seasons
2008 British television seasons